Mickaël Piscitello (born December 17, 1983), is a French-Italian Muay Thai kickboxer, famous for his technical fighting style and his elbows. He is the former W.P.M.F. World Muaythai Champion.

Biography and career

Biography 
Mickael Piscitello was born on December 17, 1983. Piscitello resides in Lyon, France and trains at Gym boxing St Fons in Lyon, Saint-Fons. His trainer is Nasser Kacem.

Early career 
He begins Muaythai at the age of 17, with Nasser Kacem who was educator in the suburbs of Lyon.
In 2010 he became W.P.M.F. World Muaythai Champion.

He faced Sudsakorn Sor Klinmee at Thai Fight: Lyon on September 19, 2012 in Lyon, France, and won via TKO due to a cut in the second round.

He then defeated Yazid Boussaha by the same manner at the A1 World Combat Cup on November 20, 2012.

A rematch between Sudsakorn and Piscitello took place at Yokkao Extreme 2013 in Milan, Italy, on January 26, 2013, Sudsakorn coming out the victor this time by way of decision.

He was floored by Kem Sitsongpeenong with elbows numerous times en route to losing a unanimous decision win at Best of Siam 3 in Paris, France, on February 14, 2013.

He was knocked out by Saiyok Pumpanmuang in round two at Thai Fight: Bangkok 2013 in Bangkok, Thailand on June 29, 2013.

It was reported that he would fight Saenchai PKSaenchaimuaythaigym at the WBC World Muay Thai Millennium Championship in Saint-Pierre, Réunion on September 7, 2013. However, Saenchai denied ever being on the card.

Titles and achievements

 2012 La Nuit des Titans Muaythai Tournament Finalist (-72 kg)
 2011 KONATEAM Tournament Champion
 2010 W.P.M.F. World Muaythai Champion (-70 kg)
 2009 A1 WCC Melbourne World Middleweight Tournament Champion
 2007 W.B.C. Muay Thai United States Super Welterweight Champion
 2006 French Muaythai Class B Champion (-71 kg)

Kickboxing record

|-
|-  bgcolor="#FFBBBB"
| 2014-11-29 || Loss||align=left| Christopher Pruvost|| Strike Fight || Lyon, France || TKO || 2|| 
|-
|-  bgcolor="#CCFFCC"
| 2014-11-29 || Win ||align=left| Thomas Nguyen || International Sanda Pro Fight Championship || Lyon, France || Decision (unanimous) || 3 || 
|-
|-  bgcolor="#FFBBBB"
| 2014-10-11 || Loss ||align=left| Jordan Watson || Yokkao 10 || Bolton, England || TKO (leg injury) || 3 || 1:18
|-
|-  bgcolor="#FFBBBB"
| 2013-09-07 || Loss ||align=left| Sitthichai Sitsongpeenong || Millenium Team Fight || La Réunion, France || KO (elbow) || 2 || 
|-
|-  bgcolor="#FFBBBB"
| 2013-06-29 || Loss ||align=left| Saiyok Pumpanmuang || Thai Fight: Bangkok 2013 || Bangkok, Thailand || KO (left elbow) || 2 || 
|-
|-  bgcolor="#FFBBBB"
| 2013-02-14 || Loss ||align=left| Kem Sitsongpeenong || Best of Siam 3 || Paris, France || Decision (unanimous) || 5 || 3:00
|-
|-  bgcolor="#FFBBBB"
| 2013-01-26 || Loss ||align=left| Sudsakorn Sor Klinmee || Yokkao Extreme 2013 || Milan, Italy || Decision (unanimous) || 3 || 3:00
|-
|-  bgcolor="#CCFFCC"
| 2012-11-20 || Win ||align=left| Yazid Boussaha || A1 World Combat Cup || France || TKO (cut) || 4 || 
|-
|-  bgcolor="#CCFFCC"
| 2012-09-19 || Win ||align=left| Sudsakorn Sor Klinmee || Thai Fight: Lyon || Lyon, France || TKO (cut) || 2 || 
|-
|-  bgcolor="#FFBBBB"
| 2012-03-17 || Loss ||align=left| Super X Por.Petchnamchai || La Nuit des Titans Tournament, Final || France  || KO (Knee to the liver) || 1 || 
|-
! style=background:white colspan=9 |
|-
|-  bgcolor="#CCFFCC"
| 2012-03-17 || Win ||align=left| Bird Kham || La Nuit des Titans Tournament, Semi Final || France  || Decision || 3 || 3:00
|-  bgcolor="#FFBBBB"
| 2011-11-27 || Loss ||align=left| Buakaw Por. Pramuk || Thai Fight 2011 70 kg Tournament, Semi Final || Bangkok, Thailand || KO (Right Elbow) || 3 || 
|-
|-  bgcolor="#CCFFCC"
| 2011-09-25 || Win ||align=left| Hafid El Boustati || Thai Fight 2011 70 kg Tournament, Quarter Final || Bangkok, Thailand || Decision || 3 || 3:00
|-
|- align="c
|-  style="background:#FFBBBB"
| 2011-05-14 || Loss ||align=left| Johann Fauveau || It's Showtime 2011 Lyon || Lyon, France || TKO (Doctor Stoppage) || 5 ||  
|-
|-  style="background:#CCFFCC"
| 2011-04-23 || Win ||align=left| Mohamed Houmer || Tournoi Konateam Cup, Final || Villiers-sur-Marne, France || TKO || 2 || 
|-
! style=background:white colspan=9 |
|-
|-  style="background:#CCFFCC"
| 2011-04-23 || Win ||align=left| Mickael Cornubet || Tournoi Konateam Cup, Semi Final || Villiers-sur-Marne, France || KO || 3 || 
|-
|-  style="background:#FFBBBB"
| 2010-11-29 || Loss ||align=left| Chanachai Kaewsamrit || Rajadamnern Stadium || Bangkok, Thailand || Decision || 5 || 3:00
|-
! style=background:white colspan=9 |
|-
|-  style="background:#CCFFCC"
| 2010-10-15 || Win ||align=left| Thanongdet Chengsimiewgym || Maxi Fight 2 || Stade de l'Est, Réunion || Decision || 5 || 3:00
|-
! style=background:white colspan=9 |
|-
|-  bgcolor="#FFBBBB"
| 2009-11-28 || Loss ||align=left| Johann Fauveau || A1 Lyon || Lyon, France || Decision || 5 || 3:00
|-
|-  bgcolor="#CCFFCC"
| 2009-11-00 || Win ||align=left| Baris Nezif || A1 WCC Melbourne, Final || Melbourne, Australia || KO (Knee) || 1 || 
|-
! style=background:white colspan=9 |
|-
|-  bgcolor="#CCFFCC"
| 2009-11-00 || Win ||align=left| Willy Borrel || A1 WCC Melbourne, Semi Final || Melbourne, Australia || TKO || 2 || 
|-
|-  bgcolor="#CCFFCC"
| 2009-11-00 || Win ||align=left| Erkan Yldiz || A1 WCC Melbourne, Quarter Final || Melbourne, Australia || Decision || 3 || 3:00
|-
|-  bgcolor="#FFBBBB"
| 2009-08-00 || Loss ||align=left| Luther Kris || Province Stadium || Thailand || Decision || 5 || 3:00
|-
|-  style="background:#FFBBBB"
| 2009-05-09 || Loss ||align=left| Bovy Sor Udomson || Thai Tournament III || Geneva, Switzerland || TKO (Referee Stoppage) || 4 || 
|-
|-  bgcolor="#FFBBBB"
| 2009-01-26 || Loss ||align=left| Paolo Iry || Diamond Fight World Tour || Paris, France || Decision || 5 || 2:00
|-
|-  bgcolor="#CCFFCC"
| 2009-00-00 || Win ||align=left| Sharos Huyer || Muaythai Gala || Italy || Decision || 5 || 3:00
|-
|-  style="background:#FFBBBB"
| 2008-12-19 || Loss ||align=left| Vitaly Gurkov || The Contender Asia S.02 Russia Qualifier, Quarter Final || Chelyabinsk, Russia || Decision || 3 || 3:00 
|-
|-  bgcolor="#CCFFCC"
| 2008-10-25 || Win ||align=left| Hichem Chaïbi || Le Choc des Best Fighters 1 || Asnières-sur-Seine, France || TKO (Elbow) || 1 || 
|-
|-  style="background:#FFBBBB"
| 2008-09-21 || Loss ||align=left| Kanongsuk Sit Jarpirt || Rajadamnern Stadium || Bangkok, Thailand || Decision || 5 || 3:00
|-
|-  bgcolor="#CCFFCC"
| 2008-06-07 || Win ||align=left| Nabil Midani || La Nuit des Challenges 5 || Lyon, Saint-Fons, France || TKO (Doctor Stoppage) || 1 || 
|-
|-  style="background:#FFBBBB"
| 2008-04-26 || Loss ||align=left| Mickael Lallemand || Gala de Pau || Pau, France || Decision || 5 || 3:00
|-
! style=background:white colspan=9 |
|-
|-  bgcolor="#CCFFCC"
| 2008-03-02 || Win ||align=left| Frederico Vella || Fighting Day 8 || Milan, Italy || Decision || 5 || 3:00
|-
|-  style="background:#FFBBBB"
| 2007-11-17 || Loss ||align=left| Farid Khider || La Nuit des Champions || Marseilles, France || Decision || 5 || 3:00
|-
|-  bgcolor="#CCFFCC"
| 2007-09-08 || Win ||align=left| Baxter Humby || WBC Muay Thai Presents: World Championship Muay Thai || Gardena, CA || TKO (Referee Stoppage) || 3 ||
|-
! style=background:white colspan=9 |
|-
|-
|-  style="background:#FFBBBB"
| 2007-07-20 || Loss ||align=left| Erkan Varol || A1 Kickbox || Turkey || Decision || 3 || 3:00
|-
|-  bgcolor="#FFBBBB"
| 2007-06-09 || Loss ||align=left| Sak Kaoponlek || La Nuit des Challenges 4 || Lyon, Saint-Fons, France || TKO (Referee Stoppage) || 2 || 
|-
|-  style="background:#FFBBBB"
| 2007-04-07 || Loss ||align=left| Nordine Amari || La Nuit des Superfights, Quarter Final || Villebon, France || Decision || 3 || 3:00
|-
|-  bgcolor="#c5d2ea"
| 2007-02-24 || Draw ||align=left| Dipo Carlo Dipaola || Gala in Jesolo || Jesolo, Italy || Decision draw || 3 || 3:00
|-
|-  style="background:#CCFFCC"
| 2007-02-17 || Win ||align=left| Omar Siala || Gala de Massy || Massy, France || TKO (Doctor Stoppage) || 1 || 
|-
|-  style="background:#FFBBBB"
| 2006-12-16 || Loss ||align=left| Gafary Boussari || French Champ. Class A, Final 8 || Paris, France || Decision || 5 || 3:00
|-
|-  bgcolor="#CCFFCC"
| 2006-06-03 || Win ||align=left| Calozarie] || La Nuit des Challenges 3 || Lyon, Saint-Fons || KO || 3 || 
|-
|-  style="background:#CCFFCC"
| 2006-04-26 || Win ||align=left| Kamel Gillet || French Champ. Class B, Final || Paris, France || Forfeit ||  || 
|-
! style=background:white colspan=9 |
|-
|-  style="background:#CCFFCC"
| 2006-03-25 || Win ||align=left| Kader Bouamama || French Champ. Class B, Semi Final || Paris, France ||  ||  || 
|-
|-  style="background:#CCFFCC"
| 2005-12-17 || Win ||align=left| Mickael Cornubet || French Champ. Class B, Quarter Final || Paris, France || Decision (Unanimous) || 4 || 3:00
|-
|-  style="background:#CCFFCC"
| 2005-01-15 || Win ||align=left| Ridouane Bencherif] || French Champ. Class B || Paris, France || TKO (Doctor Stoppage) || 1 || 
|-
|-
| colspan=9 | Legend:

See also 
List of male kickboxers

References

External links
Mickael Piscitello Interview

1983 births
Living people
French male kickboxers
French Muay Thai practitioners
French people of Italian descent